Glyptemoda is a genus of land snails with an operculum, terrestrial gastropod mollusks in the family Helicinidae. It is endemic to Cuba. The genus is monotypic, the only species being Glyptemoda torrei (Henderson, 1909). However, two subspecies are recognized:

Glyptemoda torrei torrei can reach almost  in size, whereas  Glyptemoda torrei freirei is smaller.

References 

Helicinidae
Monotypic gastropod genera
Molluscs of North America
Invertebrates of Cuba
Endemic fauna of Cuba
Taxa named by William J. Clench